The BMW M43 is an SOHC four-cylinder petrol engine which was produced from 1991-2002. The M43 powered base-model cars, while higher performance models at the time were powered by the BMW M42 and BMW M44 DOHC engines. The M43 was produced at the Steyr engine plant.

A version using natural-gas was produced for the E36 318i and the E34 518i.

Following the introduction of the BMW N42 engine in 2001, the M43 began to be phased out.

Design 
Compared with its BMW M40 predecessor, the M43 features both a camshaft position sensor and a knock sensor as well as roller rockers and a timing chain (instead of the M40's finger rockers and timing belt). It also features a dual length intake manifold ("DISA"), to provide torque across a wider rev range.

Versions

M43B16 
It uses the Bosch Motronic 1.7.x and Bosch BMS43 engine management system. There was also a natural gas-powered version of this car (also able to run on petrol) for the 1995 BMW 316g Compact.

Applications:
 1994-1998 E36 316i 
 1995-2000 E36/5 316g Compact 

Engine Management Systems:
 1993-09/1995 Bosch Motronic 1.7.2
 1995-09/1997 Bosch Motronic 1.7.3
 1997-2000 BMS43

M43B18 
The M43B18 has a  displacement. There was also a less powerful natural gas-powered version of this car (also able to run on petrol) for the BMW 518g Touring (E34). This model was only available for two years.

Applications:
 1992-1998 E36 318i
 1994-1996 E34 518i
 1995-1996 E34 518g Touring
 1995-2001 Z3 1.8

M43B19 
The  versions do not have the DISA intake manifold and also have a smaller camshaft compared to the 118 PS versions. Note the M43B16, M43B18 and the M43B19 (118 PS version) all have the same camshaft.

Applications—  and :
 1999-2001 E36 316i Compact
 1999-2002 E46 316i

Applications—  and :
 1998-2001 E46 318i/318Ci
 1999 -2002 Z3 1.9

References

See also 
List of BMW engines

M43
Straight-four engines
Gasoline engines by model